The Pakistan women's national cricket team toured Sri Lanka in January 2002. They played Sri Lanka in six One Day Internationals, with Sri Lanka winning the series 6–0.

Squads

WODI Series

1st ODI

2nd ODI

3rd ODI

4th ODI

5th ODI

6th ODI

References

External links
Pakistan Women tour of Sri Lanka 2001/02 from Cricinfo

Pakistan women's national cricket team tours
Women's international cricket tours of Sri Lanka
2002 in women's cricket
International cricket competitions in 2002